L’Union Marocaine was a francophone Jewish newspaper published in Casablanca 1932 to 1940. Its editorial line was non-Zionist and its editor was Elie Nataf, a leader of the Jewish community affiliated with the Alliance Israélite Universelle. It was established to counter the influence of the Zionist publication L’Avenir Illustré.

References 

Jewish anti-Zionism in Africa
Jewish anti-Zionism in the Arab world
Jews and Judaism in Casablanca
French-language newspapers published in Morocco